On 31 December 2004, MediaCorp and SPH MediaWorks agreed to merge effective the following day. The merger is no longer in effect on 29 September 2017, when SPH divested from Mediacorp.

Background
On 5 June 2000, then Ministry of Information and the Arts announced the start of gradual media competition, with MediaCorp allowed to own a newspaper and Singapore Press Holdings (SPH) allowed to own two TV and two radio channels.

On 8 June 2000, SPH, the country's main newspaper publishing company, set up a television arm called SPH MediaWorks to provide competition for MediaCorp, which dominated the media industry in Singapore. Instead, the rival channels were locked in a ratings battle, leading some politicians to comment that the local market was not big enough to have two broadcasting companies. By 2004, SPH MediaWorks had raked up some $44.5 million in losses.

In addition, MediaCorp was awarded a licence on 9 June 2000 by the Ministry of Information and the Arts to operate a newspaper (since known as Today).

2004: SPH and MediaCorp media market merger
On 17 September 2004, SPH announced that MediaWorks will merge with MediaCorp's TV division. A new holding company MediaCorp TV will be created with MediaCorp owning 80 percent and SPH holding the remaining 20 percent. In addition, MediaCorp Press will continue to be owned by MediaCorp; holding a 60 percent stake with 40 percent to be sold to SPH. Channel i will be reviewed for commercial viability while Streats will be merged with Today. The merger was approved by then Media Development Authority (MDA) on 6 December 2004.

Result
Many MediaWorks staff were transferred over while others were retrenched. 429 staff were affected by the merger, of which 200 staff are to be in MediaCorp, with 132 in SPH and 97 retrenched. Of the 200 staff to be posted in MediaCorp, 189 accepted the offers given.

SPH MediaWorks Channel i, the English language channel, ceased broadcasting on 1 January 2005 with its frequency and channel space was reused by Okto nearly four years later until 1 May 2019. SPH MediaWorks Channel U was renamed MediaCorp Channel U and became a complementary channel to MediaCorp's Chinese language channel Channel 8. A number of artistes and news anchors/presenters were transferred, many of whom were former employees of MediaCorp and its predecessors the Television Corporation of Singapore (TCS) and Television Twelve/Singapore Television Twelve (TV12/STV12).

Besides television, several newspaper operations were also merged and are managed by MediaCorp's newspaper division MediaCorp Press Ltd. In return, SPH became a 40% shareholder, mainly in Today, MediaCorp's main newspaper.

2017: SPH's divestment from Mediacorp
On 25 August 2017, SPH announced its divestment of shares from Mediacorp, being 20 percent in Mediacorp TV and 40 percent in Mediacorp Press respectively to focus on its core media businesses. Mediacorp acquired these stakes for S$18 million, resulting in both companies being full subsidiaries of Mediacorp. This comes after Mediacorp announced a cessation of Today's publication as a hardcopy with a move towards digitalisation from end-September 2017, coming as more readers consume news online. The digitalisation of Today resulted in 40 roles being redundant. For five years since that date, Mediacorp will not publish any soft copy or digital format of Today similar to a hardcopy newspaper. The acquisition of SPH's stakes was completed on 29 September 2017, thus returning to 2000 when media competition had not started yet.

See also
Mediacorp
SPH MediaWorks

References

External links
News Release by MDA

2004 in Singapore
2017 in Singapore
Broadcasting in Singapore
Mediacorp
SPH MediaWorks